Maurice Alfred Crouch (9 August 1917 – 19 March 2001) was an English cricketer.  A right-handed batsman,  he was born at Wisbech, Cambridgeshire.

Crouch played most of his cricket for Cambridgeshire in the Minor Counties Championship, making his debut against Bedfordshire in 1936.  From 1936 to 1963, he represented the county in 118 Minor Counties matches.  His final game for the county came in his only List-A appearance, which came in the 1964 Gillette Cup against Essex.  In the match, he scored 28 runs before being dismissed by Robin Hobbs.

Crouch also played first-class cricket, representing the Marylebone Cricket Club against a combined Minor Counties cricket team in 1950.  The following year, he represented the Minor Counties in a first-class match against Kent, in what was his only first-class appearance for a combined Minor Counties side.  His final two first-class appearances came in 1952 for the Marylebone Cricket Club against Oxford University and Ireland.  In his 4 first-class matches, he scored 205 runs at a batting average of 29.28, with a single half century high score of 81.

Crouch died in Morocco on 19 March 2001.

Family
His son-in-law David Fairey also represented Cambridgeshire in cricket.

References

External links
Maurice Crouch at Cricinfo
Maurice Crouch at CricketArchive

1917 births
2001 deaths
People from Wisbech
English cricketers
Cambridgeshire cricketers
Marylebone Cricket Club cricketers
Minor Counties cricketers